Line 1 is a north-south line of the Shanghai Metro. The first line to open in the Shanghai Metro system, line 1 serves many important points in Shanghai, including  and Xujiahui. Due to the large number of important locations served, this line is extremely busy, with a daily ridership of over 1,000,000 passengers. Generally, the line runs at grade beside the Shanghai–Hangzhou railway in the south, underground in the city center and elevated on the second deck of the North–South Elevated Road in the North. The line is colored red on system maps.

History 

The required investment for the project was US$620 million (including domestic supporting RMB investment). In August 1988 and May 1989, the program of loans to the Federal Republic of Germany, France and the United States was approved by the State Planning Commission.
 The Federal Government of Germany has a loan of 460 million marks, an annual interest rate of 0.75%, a committed rate of 0.25%, a repayment period of 30 years, and a grace period of 10 years.
 French mixed loan of 132 million francs, of which 54% of government soft loans, annual interest rate of 2%, loan repayment period of 19 years, grace period of 11 years; export credit 46%, annual interest rate of 8.3%, loan repayment period of 10 years, grace period of 22 month.
 The US loaned USD 23.18 million, of which 45% were government grants and 55% were commercial loans. The annual interest rate fluctuates, the loan repayment period is 10 years, and the grace period is 5 years.
With the start of construction of the project, the cost has also increased. In August 1993, the budgetary estimate was adjusted to 3.974 billion yuan, of which domestic supporting funds increased by 1.086 billion yuan. In January 1995, the total budget was adjusted for the second time to 5.39 billion yuan, of which 3.961 billion yuan was domestic supporting funds.

 December 28, 1996 - Separate southern section from Jinjiang Park (formerly known as Hongmei Road South) to Xinzhuang opens. Northern extension continues to operate to Shanghai Railway Station.
 July 1, 1997 - The northern and southern sections are connected, forming one complete line from Shanghai Railway Station - Xinzhuang.
 December 28, 2004 - Line runs from Gongfu Xincun - Xinzhuang after northern extension opens.
 December 29, 2007 - Second northern extension opens; full line runs from Fujin Road - Xinzhuang.

Stations

Service routes

Important stations 
  - Connects the metro with the main railway station in the city, allowing rail transport to and from other provinces. Virtual Interchange with lines 3 and 4.
  - This station serves a business and shopping area, and is also close to multiple tourist attractions making the station busy all day long. Interchange with lines 2 and 8.
  - This is a business and commercial area, also with tourist attractions such as the Xujiahui Cathedral. Interchange with lines 9 and 11.
  - This station is located at the sports stadium of the same name and the biggest regional and long distance bus station in the city. Interchange with line 4.
  - This station serves the second railway station of the city, which accommodates trains serving cities mainly to the south. Interchange with lines 3 and 15.
  - The southern terminus of line 1; interchange with line 5.

Future expansion

West extension of line 1 
A  extension to Humin road (North Xinzhuang Station) has been approved as part of the National Development and Reform Commission has approved the 2018-2023 construction planning of the city's Metro network. Work is expected to begin before 2023 and will take 4 years at acost of US$518. The extension will connect to the under construction Jiamin line.

Headways 
<onlyinclude>
<onlyinclude>

Technology

Signalling 
As the first line in the system, Shanghai Metro was conceived and designed during 1980s, when fixed block signalling and track circuit based train control (TBTC) was still considered a state-of-art approach to automatic train operation. The signalling system was designed by CASCO, a signalling manufacturer owned jointly by China Railway Signal & Communication Group Corporation (CRSC) and General Railway Signal (GRS), and was largely based on the system designed by GRS for the Washington Metro. Coded audio-frequency (AF) track circuits are used for both train detection and transmission of speed commands, as well as limited train-to-wayside communication (TWC) for automatic train supervision (ATS). Train operation between stations and station stop can be automatic, while doors are controlled manually by train operators.

From 2013 to 2019, the system was completely renewed, with obsolete components such as relay interlockings replaced by modern microprocessor-based ones, but the general operation of the signaling system remained unchanged. As of 2020, the original design is expected to serve two additional decades.

Rolling Stock
In the summer of 2006 after poor cooling effect of the 16 subway DC trains on Line 1 in summer and the high temperature of the carriages had long been a problem, 96 ice cubes have been put into a one-meter-high waste container to alleviate the high temperature of the 16 subway DC trains on Line 1. In order to make up for the defects in the refrigeration power and design of the 16 DC trains, emergency measures must be taken whenever the temperature reaches  or more. With the transformation between 2006 and 2008 from 6 carriages to 8 carriages the of the air-conditioning system was improvement, making the ice waste containers something of the past.

The line was initially operated by trains built by the German Shanghai Metro Group which included Adtranz (now Bombardier) and Siemens together with AEG Westinghouse and Düwag.

Former Rolling Stock

References 

Shanghai Metro lines
 
Railway lines opened in 1993
1993 establishments in China